The 1991–92 Pittsburgh Penguins season was the Penguins' 25th season in the National Hockey League (NHL). The team was coming off of its first-ever Stanley Cup victory in 1990–91, as they defeated the Minnesota North Stars in the Finals in six games. The Penguins, along with the Detroit Red Wings and New York Rangers, had five 30-goal scorers. Six players and three off-ice staff members from the 1991-92 team's year-end roster have been elected to the Hockey Hall of Fame.

Off-season
In the off-season, Head Coach Bob Johnson was diagnosed with brain cancer, forcing him to step down, where the Penguins brought in former St. Louis Blues, Montreal Canadiens, and Buffalo Sabres head coach Scotty Bowman to replace Johnson. Bowman had previously led the Canadiens to five Stanley Cup championships in the 1970s. Johnson lost his battle to cancer on November 26, 1991, and the Penguins honored him by wearing a patch on the left sleeve of their jersey with his nickname "Badger" written on it along with his birth year and death year.

Regular season
Pittsburgh started the season off very well, and through their first 38 games, they had a record of 22–12–4, earning 48 points and fighting with the Washington Capitals and New York Rangers for first in the Division. The team, along with Mario Lemieux, who missed time due to a back injury, would slump in their next 24 games, going 5–15–4 to slide down to .500 and battling with the New York Islanders and Philadelphia Flyers for the final playoff position in the Division. The Penguins, facing losing defenseman Paul Coffey as a free agent after the season, would deal him to the Los Angeles Kings in a move that looked like they were giving up for the season, however, they would make a move to bring some more grit to the team, acquiring Rick Tocchet, Kjell Samuelsson, and Ken Wregget from Philadelphia for Mark Recchi, and the club would have a 12–5–1 record to close out the season, finishing in third place in the Division and making the playoffs for the second-straight season.

Mario Lemieux led the club offensively, despite missing 16 games to injuries, as he earned an NHL-high 131 points from 44 goals and 87 assists to win the Art Ross Trophy. Kevin Stevens led the team with 54 goals and finished second in League scoring behind Lemieux with 123 points. Joe Mullen also had a solid season, as he scored 42 goals and earned 87 points, while Jaromír Jágr continued to develop, as he recorded 69 points in 70 games. Larry Murphy put up a defense-high 77 points in his first full season with the Penguins.

In goal, Tom Barrasso played the majority of the games, earning a team high 25 victories, along with a team best 3.53 goals against average (GAA), while earning a shutout for the club.

Offensively, the Penguins led the NHL in scoring, with 343 goals for.

On October 29, 1991, the Penguins were shut out at home 8–0 by the Washington Capitals. It was the first time the Penguins had been shut-out in a regular season game since January 2, 1989, when they coincidentally lost 8–0 on the road also to the Capitals. Prior to their home loss against the Caps, the Penguins had gone 211 consecutive regular season games without being shut-out.

Sale to Baldwin and Belzberg
Although owner Edward DeBartolo, Sr. had enjoyed his team winning the Stanley Cup, the elder DeBartolo sought to sell the Penguins, but did not have a deal in place prior to the start of the season. Minnesota North Stars co-owners Howard Baldwin and Morris Belzberg had sold their stakes in that team to fellow co-owner Norman Green following a dispute between the owners, with Baldwin having sold his interest in August and Belzberg selling off in October. Baldwin and Belzberg partnered together to purchase the Penguins, and the NHL approved the deal on November 18, 1991.

Season standings

Schedule and results

|-  style="background:#cfc;"
| 1 || 4 || 7:35 PM || Pittsburgh Penguins || 5–4 || Buffalo Sabres || Buffalo Memorial Auditorium || 1–0–0 || 2
|-  style="background:#ffc;"
| 2 || 6 || 7:35 PM || Philadelphia Flyers || 2–2 OT || Pittsburgh Penguins || Civic Arena || 1–0–1 || 3
|-  style="background:#cfc;"
| 3 || 10 || 7:35 PM || Pittsburgh Penguins || 6–3 || Philadelphia Flyers || The Spectrum || 2–0–1 || 5
|-  style="background:#fcf;"
| 4 || 12 || 7:45 PM || Pittsburgh Penguins || 1–4 || New Jersey Devils || Brendan Byrne Arena || 2–1–1 || 5
|-  style="background:#cfc;"
| 5 || 15 || 7:35 PM || Pittsburgh Penguins || 7–6 OT || New York Islanders || Nassau Veterans Memorial Coliseum || 3–1–1 || 7
|-  style="background:#cfc;"
| 6 || 17 || 7:35 PM || New York Islanders || 5–8 || Pittsburgh Penguins || Civic Arena || 4–1–1 || 9
|-  style="background:#fcf;"
| 7 || 19 || 7:35 PM || New York Rangers || 5–4 || Pittsburgh Penguins || Civic Arena || 4–2–1 || 9
|-  style="background:#ffc;"
| 8 || 22 || 7:35 PM || Chicago Blackhawks || 4–4 OT || Pittsburgh Penguins || Civic Arena || 4–2–2 || 10
|-  style="background:#fcf;"
| 9 || 24 || 7:35 PM || New Jersey Devils || 4–2 || Pittsburgh Penguins || Civic Arena || 4–3–2 || 10
|-  style="background:#fcf;"
| 10 || 26 || 8:05 PM || Pittsburgh Penguins || 1–4 || Montreal Canadiens || Montreal Forum || 4–4–2 || 10
|-  style="background:#fcf;"
| 11 || 29 || 7:35 PM || Washington Capitals || 8–0 || Pittsburgh Penguins || Civic Arena || 4–5–2 || 10
|-  style="background:#cfc;"
| 12 || 31 || 7:35 PM || Minnesota North Stars || 1–8 || Pittsburgh Penguins || Civic Arena || 5–5–2 || 12
|-

|-  style="background:#fcf;"
| 13 || 2 || 7:35 PM || Hartford Whalers || 6–5 || Pittsburgh Penguins || Civic Arena || 5–6–2 || 12
|-  style="background:#ffc;"
| 14 || 5 || 7:35 PM || Boston Bruins || 5–5 OT || Pittsburgh Penguins || Civic Arena || 5–6–3 || 13
|-  style="background:#cfc;"
| 15 || 8 || 8:35 PM || Pittsburgh Penguins || 3–1 || Winnipeg Jets || Winnipeg Arena || 6–6–3 || 15
|-  style="background:#cfc;"
| 16 || 9 || 8:05 PM || Pittsburgh Penguins || 3–2 || Minnesota North Stars || Met Center || 7–6–3 || 17
|-  style="background:#fcf;"
| 17 || 11 || 7:35 PM || Pittsburgh Penguins || 1–3 || New York Rangers || Madison Square Garden (IV) || 7–7–3 || 17
|-  style="background:#cfc;"
| 18 || 13 || 7:35 PM || Edmonton Oilers || 4–5 OT || Pittsburgh Penguins || Civic Arena || 8–7–3 || 19
|-  style="background:#fcf;"
| 19 || 15 || 8:05 PM || Pittsburgh Penguins || 2–6 || Washington Capitals || Capital Centre || 8–8–3 || 19
|-  style="background:#cfc;"
| 20 || 18 || 7:35 PM || Pittsburgh Penguins || 7–3 || Quebec Nordiques || Colisée de Québec || 9–8–3 || 21
|-  style="background:#cfc;"
| 21 || 20 || 7:35 PM || Philadelphia Flyers || 2–5 || Pittsburgh Penguins || Civic Arena || 10–8–3 || 23
|-  style="background:#ffc;"
| 22 || 23 || 7:35 PM || New York Islanders || 2–2 OT || Pittsburgh Penguins || Civic Arena || 10–8–4 || 24
|-  style="background:#cfc;"
| 23 || 27 || 7:35 PM || New Jersey Devils || 4–8 || Pittsburgh Penguins || Civic Arena || 11–8–4 || 26
|-  style="background:#cfc;"
| 24 || 29 || 1:05 PM || Pittsburgh Penguins || 9–3 || Philadelphia Flyers || The Spectrum || 12–8–4 || 28
|-  style="background:#cfc;"
| 25 || 30 || 7:35 PM || Philadelphia Flyers || 1–5 || Pittsburgh Penguins || Civic Arena || 13–8–4 || 30
|-

|-  style="background:#fcf;"
| 26 || 3 || 9:35 PM || Pittsburgh Penguins || 3–5 || Edmonton Oilers || Northlands Coliseum || 13–9–4 || 30
|-  style="background:#cfc;"
| 27 || 5 || 10:35 PM || Pittsburgh Penguins || 8–0 || San Jose Sharks || Cow Palace || 14–9–4 || 32
|-  style="background:#fcf;"
| 28 || 7 || 8:35 PM || Pittsburgh Penguins || 1–6 || St. Louis Blues || St. Louis Arena || 14–10–4 || 32
|-  style="background:#cfc;"
| 29 || 10 || 7:35 PM || New York Rangers || 3–5 || Pittsburgh Penguins || Civic Arena || 15–10–4 || 34
|-  style="background:#cfc;"
| 30 || 13 || 7:45 PM || Pittsburgh Penguins || 4–3 || New Jersey Devils || Brendan Byrne Arena || 16–10–4 || 36
|-  style="background:#fcf;"
| 31 || 14 || 7:35 PM || Washington Capitals || 7–2 || Pittsburgh Penguins || Civic Arena || 16–11–4 || 36
|-  style="background:#cfc;"
| 32 || 17 || 7:35 PM || San Jose Sharks || 2–10 || Pittsburgh Penguins || Civic Arena || 17–11–4 || 38
|-  style="background:#cfc;"
| 33 || 19 || 7:35 PM || Pittsburgh Penguins || 6–4 || Boston Bruins || Boston Garden || 18–11–4 || 40
|-  style="background:#fcf;"
| 34 || 21 || 7:35 PM || New York Rangers || 7–5 || Pittsburgh Penguins || Civic Arena || 18–12–4 || 40
|-  style="background:#cfc;"
| 35 || 23 || 7:35 PM || Pittsburgh Penguins || 6–3 || New York Islanders || Nassau Veterans Memorial Coliseum || 19–12–4 || 42
|-  style="background:#cfc;"
| 36 || 26 || 7:35 PM || Toronto Maple Leafs || 1–12 || Pittsburgh Penguins || Civic Arena || 20–12–4 || 44
|-  style="background:#cfc;"
| 37 || 28 || 7:35 PM || Pittsburgh Penguins || 6–2 || Washington Capitals || Capital Centre || 21–12–4 || 46
|-  style="background:#cfc;"
| 38 || 29 || 7:35 PM || Pittsburgh Penguins || 6–3 || New York Rangers || Madison Square Garden (IV) || 22–12–4 || 48
|-  style="background:#fcf;"
| 39 || 31 || 6:05 PM || New Jersey Devils || 7–4 || Pittsburgh Penguins || Civic Arena || 22–13–4 || 48
|-

|-  style="background:#fcf;"
| 40 || 2 || 7:45 PM || Pittsburgh Penguins || 0–4 || New Jersey Devils || Brendan Byrne Arena || 22–14–4 || 48
|-  style="background:#cfc;"
| 41 || 4 || 1:35 PM || Winnipeg Jets || 2–3 || Pittsburgh Penguins || Civic Arena || 23–14–4 || 50
|-  style="background:#fcf;"
| 42 || 7 || 7:35 PM || Los Angeles Kings || 5–2 || Pittsburgh Penguins || Civic Arena || 23–15–4 || 50
|-  style="background:#fcf;"
| 43 || 10 || 9:35 PM || Pittsburgh Penguins || 5–7 || Calgary Flames || Olympic Saddledome || 23–16–4 || 50
|-  style="background:#cfc;"
| 44 || 12 || 5:05 PM || Pittsburgh Penguins || 4–3 || Vancouver Canucks || Pacific Coliseum || 24–16–4 || 52
|-  style="background:#ffc;"
| 45 || 16 || 7:35 PM || Pittsburgh Penguins || 3–3 OT || Detroit Red Wings || Joe Louis Arena || 24–16–5 || 53
|-  style="background:#fcf;"
| 46 || 23 || 7:35 PM || Buffalo Sabres || 5–4 OT || Pittsburgh Penguins || Civic Arena || 24–17–5 || 53
|-  style="background:#cfc;"
| 47 || 25 || 2:05 PM || Pittsburgh Penguins || 5–3 || New York Islanders || Nassau Veterans Memorial Coliseum || 25–17–5 || 55
|-  style="background:#fcf;"
| 48 || 26 || 12:05 PM || Pittsburgh Penguins || 4–6 || Washington Capitals || Capital Centre || 25–18–5 || 55
|-  style="background:#fcf;"
| 49 || 28 || 7:35 PM || Winnipeg Jets || 4–0 || Pittsburgh Penguins || Civic Arena || 25–19–5 || 55
|-  style="background:#fcf;"
| 50 || 30 || 7:35 PM || New York Islanders || 8–5 || Pittsburgh Penguins || Civic Arena || 25–20–5 || 55
|-

|-  style="background:#cfc;"
| 51 || 1 || 1:35 PM || St. Louis Blues || 1–4 || Pittsburgh Penguins || Civic Arena || 26–20–5 || 57
|-  style="background:#ffc;"
| 52 || 3 || 7:35 PM || Detroit Red Wings || 4–4 OT || Pittsburgh Penguins || Civic Arena || 26–20–6 || 58
|-  style="background:#fcf;"
| 53 || 5 || 7:35 PM || Pittsburgh Penguins || 3–4 || New York Rangers || Madison Square Garden (IV) || 26–21–6 || 58
|-  style="background:#fcf;"
| 54 || 8 || 2:05 PM || Los Angeles Kings || 4–3 || Pittsburgh Penguins || Civic Arena || 26–22–6 || 58
|-  style="background:#fcf;"
| 55 || 9 || 1:35 PM || Pittsburgh Penguins || 3–6 || Boston Bruins || Boston Garden || 26–23–6 || 58
|-  style="background:#fcf;"
| 56 || 15 || 8:05 PM || Pittsburgh Penguins || 2–5 || Minnesota North Stars || Met Center || 26–24–6 || 58
|-  style="background:#ffc;"
| 57 || 16 || 7:05 PM || Pittsburgh Penguins || 3–3 OT || Philadelphia Flyers || The Spectrum || 26–24–7 || 59
|-  style="background:#cfc;"
| 58 || 18 || 7:35 PM || Toronto Maple Leafs || 1–7 || Pittsburgh Penguins || Civic Arena || 27–24–7 || 61
|-  style="background:#ffc;"
| 59 || 20 || 7:35 PM || Quebec Nordiques || 4–4 OT || Pittsburgh Penguins || Civic Arena || 27–24–8 || 62
|-  style="background:#fcf;"
| 60 || 22 || 8:05 PM || Pittsburgh Penguins || 1–2 || Montreal Canadiens || Montreal Forum || 27–25–8 || 62
|-  style="background:#fcf;"
| 61 || 25 || 7:35 PM || Pittsburgh Penguins || 3–5 || Washington Capitals || Capital Centre || 27–26–8 || 62
|-  style="background:#fcf;"
| 62 || 27 || 7:35 PM || Hartford Whalers || 8–4 || Pittsburgh Penguins || Civic Arena || 27–27–8 || 62
|-  style="background:#cfc;"
| 63 || 29 || 1:35 PM || Buffalo Sabres || 2–5 || Pittsburgh Penguins || Civic Arena || 28–27–8 || 64
|-

|-  style="background:#cfc;"
| 64 || 3 || 9:35 PM || Pittsburgh Penguins || 6–3 || Calgary Flames || Olympic Saddledome || 29–27–8 || 66
|-  style="background:#cfc;"
| 65 || 6 || 10:35 PM || Pittsburgh Penguins || 7–3 || San Jose Sharks || Cow Palace  || 30–27–8 || 68
|-  style="background:#fcf;"
| 66 || 7 || 10:35 PM || Pittsburgh Penguins || 3–5 || Los Angeles Kings || Great Western Forum || 30–28–8 || 68
|-  style="background:#cfc;"
| 67 || 10 || 7:35 PM || Calgary Flames || 2–5 || Pittsburgh Penguins || Civic Arena || 31–28–8 || 70
|-  style="background:#cfc;"
| 68 || 12 || 7:35 PM || New York Islanders || 4–6 || Pittsburgh Penguins || Civic Arena || 32–28–8 || 72
|-  style="background:#fcf;"
| 69 || 14 || 8:05 PM || Pittsburgh Penguins || 3–6 || Toronto Maple Leafs || Maple Leaf Gardens || 32–29–8 || 72
|-  style="background:#cfc;"
| 70 || 15 || 8:35 PM || Pittsburgh Penguins || 4–3 || Chicago Blackhawks || Chicago Stadium || 33–29–8 || 74
|-  style="background:#cfc;"
| 71 || 17 || 7:35 PM || Edmonton Oilers || 5–6 || Pittsburgh Penguins || Civic Arena || 34–29–8 || 76
|-  style="background:#cfc;"
| 72 || 19 || 7:35 PM || Quebec Nordiques || 3–6 || Pittsburgh Penguins || Civic Arena || 35–29–8 || 78
|-  style="background:#ffc;"
| 73 || 22 || 7:05 PM || Pittsburgh Penguins || 2–2 OT || Hartford Whalers || Hartford Civic Center || 35–29–9 || 79
|-  style="background:#fcf;"
| 74 || 24 || 7:35 PM || Pittsburgh Penguins || 3–4 || Detroit Red Wings || Joe Louis Arena || 35–30–9 || 79
|-  style="background:#cfc;"
| 75 || 26 || 7:35 PM || Vancouver Canucks || 3–7 || Pittsburgh Penguins || Civic Arena || 36–30–9 || 81
|-  style="background:#cfc;"
| 76 || 28 || 8:05 PM || Montreal Canadiens || 3–6 || Pittsburgh Penguins || Civic Arena || 37–30–9 || 83
|-  style="background:#cfc;"
| 77 || 31 || 7:35 PM || Philadelphia Flyers || 5–6 || Pittsburgh Penguins || Civic Arena || 38–30–9 || 85
|-

|-  style="background:#fcf;"
| 78 || 13 || 7:45 PM || Pittsburgh Penguins || 1–5 || New Jersey Devils || Brendan Byrne Arena || 38–31–9 || 85
|-  style="background:#cfc;"
| 79 || 15 || 7:35 PM || Washington Capitals || 1–4 || Pittsburgh Penguins || Civic Arena || 39–31–9 || 87
|-  style="background:#fcf;"
| 80 || 16 || 7:35 PM || Pittsburgh Penguins || 1–7 || New York Rangers || Madison Square Garden (IV) || 39–32–9 || 87
|-

|- style="text-align:center;"
| Legend:       = Win       = Loss       = Tie

Playoffs

Division Semifinals
In the playoffs, the Penguins would open up against the Washington Capitals, who they defeated in the second round in the previous season en route to the Stanley Cup championship. The Capitals finished the season 11 points ahead of Pittsburgh, and had home ice for the series.  Washington would open the series up with two solid victories at home, however, Pittsburgh responded with a Game 3 victory to cut the Caps series lead in half. Washington would demolish the Penguins in the fourth game, going up 3–1 in the series, and returning home in hopes of closing it out. Pittsburgh had no trouble beating the Capitals in Game 5, winning 5–2, and evened the series up at home in Game 6 with a 6–4 win. In the seventh and deciding game of the series, Tom Barrasso would step up, allowing only one goal as Pittsburgh won the final game by a 3–1 scoreline to upset the favored Capitals and complete the series comeback.

Division Finals
Up next was the Patrick Division-winning New York Rangers, who had 18 more points than Pittsburgh during the regular season. Pittsburgh would surprise the Rangers with a 4–2 victory in the opening game, however, New York tied the series up in the second game. The Rangers took a 2–1 series lead with 6–5 overtime victory. The Penguins would tie the series up with their own overtime win in the fourth game, as the series returned to New York for the fifth game. Pittsburgh would hang on for a 3–2 victory in the fifth game, and close out the series at home with a 5–1 win, to upset the Rangers, and return to the Conference Finals.

Conference Finals
The Penguins next opponent was the Boston Bruins, who they defeated in the playoffs the previous year in six games. The Bruins had 84 points during the regular season, three less than the Penguins, giving Pittsburgh home ice advantage. The Pens opened up the series with a 4–3 overtime win, then went up 2–0 in the series with a 5–2 win, as the series would shift to Boston. The Penguins stayed hot, winning Games 3 and 4 by identical 5–1 scorelines, to sweep the Bruins, and reach the Stanley Cup finals for the second-straight season.

Stanley Cup Finals

Pittsburgh had to defeat the Chicago Blackhawks in hopes of a second-straight Stanley Cup. The 'Hawks finished the season with 87 points, the same amount as the Penguins, and had defeated the St. Louis Blues, Detroit Red Wings and Edmonton Oilers en route to the Finals, entering the series with an NHL playoff record 11-game winning streak. The Penguins, however, were on their own seven-game winning streak, as they won the last three games of the Rangers series and four in the Boston series. Pittsburgh stayed hot, with a 5–4 victory in Game 1, and then defeated Chicago 3–1 in Game 2 to go up 2–0 as the series would move to Chicago Stadium. The Penguins would then shut-out Chicago 1–0 in the third game to win their tenth in a row, with Pittsburgh finishing off the sweep after a 6–5 Game 4 win, tying the Blackhawks' NHL playoff record with their own 11th-straight win as they would become the first team since the 1986–87 and 1987–88 Edmonton Oilers to win back-to-back Stanley Cups. Mario Lemieux won the Conn Smythe Trophy for the second straight year, as he recorded a League-high 34 points in just 15 playoff games.

Playoff log

|- style="background:#fcf;"
| 1 || April 19||Pittsburgh||1–3||Washington|| ||Loney||Bondra,Druce, Bondra||Barrasso (0–1)||16,689||0–1||
|- style="background:#fcf;"
| 2 || April 21||Pittsburgh||2–6||Washington|| ||Murphy, Stevens||Khristich, Bondra,Pivonka, Cote, Ciccarelli, Miller||Barrasso (0–2)||17,453||0–2||
|- style="background:#cfc;"
| 3 || April 23||Washington||4–6||Pittsburgh|| ||Bourque, Mullen, Jagr,Lemieux (2), Lemieux (en)||Hatcher, Khristich, Iafrate, Hatcher||Barrasso (1–2)||16,164||1–2||
|- style="background:#fcf;"
| 4 || April 25||Washington||7–2||Pittsburgh|| ||Lemieux, Trottier||Krygier, Ciccarelli,Kristich, Ciccarelli, Bondra, Ciccarelli||Barrasso (1–3)||16,164||1–3||
|- style="background:#cfc;"
| 5 || April 27||Pittsburgh||5–2||Washington|| ||Trottier, Errey,Murphy, Jagr, Errey (en)||Krygier, Iafrate||Barrasso (2–3)||17,621||2–3||
|- style="background:#cfc;"
| 6 || April 29||Washington||4–6||Pittsburgh|| ||Stevens (2), Mullen, Bourque,Lemieux (2)||Hunter, Bondra (2), Iafrate||Barrasso (3–3)||16,164||3–3||
|- style="background:#cff;"
| 7 || May 1||Pittsburgh||3–1||Washington|| ||Lemieux,Jagr, Mullen (en)||Iafrate||Barrasso (4–3)||17,783||4–3||
|-

|- style="background:#cfc;"
| 1 || May 3||Pittsburgh||4–2||N.Y. Rangers|| ||Loney, Murphy,Stevens, Francis||King, Amonte||Barrasso (5–3)||17,744||1–0||
|- style="background:#fcf;"
| 2 || May 5||Pittsburgh||2–4||N.Y. Rangers|| ||Stevens, Murphy||Leetch, Beukeboom,King, Beukeboom (en)||Barrasso (5–4)||18,200||1–1||
|- style="background:#fcf;"
| 3 || May 7||N.Y. Rangers||6–5||Pittsburgh||1:29||Stevens, Francis (2), Murphy, Stevens||Graves, Kerr, Nemchinov, Gartner, Erixon,King||Barrasso (5–5)||16,164||1–2||
|- style="background:#cfc;"
| 4 || May 9||N.Y. Rangers||4–5||Pittsburgh||2:47||Needham, Francis (2), Loney,Francis||Gilhen, Amonte, Messier (2)||Barrasso (6–5)||16,164||2–2||
|- style="background:#cfc;"
| 5 || May 11||Pittsburgh||3–2||N.Y. Rangers|| ||Tocchet,Jagr (2)||Turcotte, Gartner||Barrasso (7–5)||18,200||3–2||
|- style="background:#cff;"
| 6 || May 13||N.Y. Rangers||1–5||Pittsburgh|| ||Tocchet,Jagr, McEachern, Tocchet (en), Francis (en)||Weight||Barrasso (8–5)||16,164||4–2||
|-

|- style="background:#cfc;"
| 1 || May 17||Boston||3–4||Pittsburgh||9:44||Trottier, Callander, McEachern,Jagr||Sweeney, Donato, Wesley||Barrasso (9–5)||16,164||1–0||
|- style="background:#cfc;"
| 2 || May 19||Boston||2–5||Pittsburgh|| ||Loney, Jagr,Tocchet, Lemieux, Lemieux (en)||Murray, Oates||Barrasso (10–5)||16,164||2–0||
|- style="background:#cfc;"
| 3 || May 21||Pittsburgh||5–1||Boston|| ||Stevens (3),, Trottier, Stevens||Juneau||Barrasso (11–5)||14,448||3–0||
|- style="background:#cff;"
| 4 || May 23||Pittsburgh||5–1||Boston|| ||Jagr,Lemieux, Stanton, Lemieux, Michayluk||Leach||Barrasso (12–5)||14,448||4–0||
|-

|- style="background:#cfc;"
| 1 || May 26||Chicago||4–5||Pittsburgh|| ||Bourque, Tocchet, Lemieux, Jagr,Lemieux||Chelios, Goulet, Graham, Sutter||Barrasso (13–5)||16,164||1–0||
|- style="background:#cfc;"
| 2 || May 28||Chicago||1–3||Pittsburgh|| ||Errey,Lemieux (2)||Marchment||Barrasso (14–5)||16,164||2–0||
|- style="background:#cfc;"
| 3 || May 30||Pittsburgh||1–0||Chicago|| ||Stevens|| ||Barrasso (15–5)||18,472||3–0||
|- style="background:#cff;"
| 4 || June 1||Pittsburgh||6–5||Chicago|| ||Jagr, Stevens, Lemieux, Tocchet, Murphy,Francis||Graham (3), Roenick (2)||Barrasso (16–5)||18,472||4–0||
|-

|-
| Legend:       = Win       = Loss       = Playoff series win

 Scorer of game-winning goal in italics

Player statistics
Skaters

Goaltenders

†Denotes player spent time with another team before joining the Penguins.  Stats reflect time with the Penguins only.
‡Denotes player was traded mid-season.  Stats reflect time with the Penguins only.

Awards and records
 Mario Lemieux became the first person to score 900 points for the Penguins. He did so in a 5–6 loss to Hartford on November 2.
 Mario Lemieux became the first person to score 400 goals for the Penguins. He did so in a 3–6 loss to Toronto on March 14.
 Mario Lemieux became the first person to score 1000 points for the Penguins. He did so in a 3–4 loss to Detroit on March 24.
 Mario Lemieux became the first person to score 600 assists for the Penguins. He did so in a 7–3 win over Vancouver on March 26.
 Paul Coffey established franchise records for goals (108) assists (332) and points (440) by a defenseman. He had set record for each category within the previous two seasons.

Awards

Transactions
The Penguins were involved in the following transactions during the 1991–92 season:

Trades

Free agents

Signings

Other

Draft picks
Pittsburgh's draft picks at the 1991 NHL Entry Draft.

Farm teams
The IHL's Muskegon Lumberjacks finished second in the East Division with a 41-28-13 record.  They defeated the Milwaukee Admirals and Kalamazoo Wings before being swept by the Kansas City Blades in the Turner Cup Finals.  This finals loss came as a result of the Penguins recalling Jock Callander, Mike Needham, and Dave Michayluk to fill open spots left by injuries to both Mario Lemieux and Joe Mullen.  Michayluk still won the Ironman Award by the IHL for playing in all of his team's games while displaying outstanding offensive and defensive abilities.

The East Coast Hockey League's Knoxville Cherokees finished last overall in the standings with a record of 20-36-8.

Media affiliates
Radio

Some of the games broadcast on WDVE because of KDKA-AM's broadcast conflict with the Pittsburgh Pirates.

Television

See also
 1991–92 NHL season

References

 SHRP Sports
 The Internet Hockey Database
 National Hockey League Guide & Record Book 2007

Stanley Cup championship seasons
Pittsburgh Penguins seasons
Pitts
Pitts
Eastern Conference (NHL) championship seasons
Pitts
Pitts
Pitts